The 31st Louisiana Infantry Regiment was a unit of volunteers recruited in Louisiana that fought in the Confederate States Army during the American Civil War. The unit began its existence as Morrison's Battalion on 14 May 1862. The regiment organized at Monroe, Louisiana, on 11 June, after which it moved to Madison Parish, Louisiana, near Vicksburg, Mississippi. The unit stayed near Tallulah and Delhi until November, when it was ordered to Jackson, Mississippi. There, the Catahoula Battalion joined the regiment, bringing it up to ten companies. In December 1862, the regiment fought at Chickasaw Bayou. After remaining near Vicksburg in the early part of the year, it fought at Port Gibson on 1 May 1863. During the Siege of Vicksburg, the soldiers defended the city, surrendered when the place fell, and were paroled. When the regiment was exchanged in June 1864, many of the men chose to remain at home. The soldiers who returned to duty eventually marched to Pineville, which they guarded until February 1865. At that time, the regiment marched to Bayou Cotile. The unit disbanded in May 1865.

See also
List of Louisiana Confederate Civil War units
Louisiana in the Civil War

Notes

References

 

Units and formations of the Confederate States Army from Louisiana
1862 establishments in Louisiana
Military units and formations established in 1862
1865 disestablishments in Louisiana
Military units and formations disestablished in 1865